Bernardino d'Aragona(1611–1664) was a Roman Catholic prelate who served as Bishop of Bova (1657–1669).

Biography
Bernardino d'Aragona was born in Carpanzano, Italy on 19 February 1657.
On 19 February 1657, he was appointed during the papacy of Pope Alexander VII as Bishop of Bova.
On 11 March 1657, he was consecrated bishop by Bernardino Spada, Cardinal-Bishop of Palestrina. 
He served as Bishop of Bova until his death on 12 July 1669.

References

External links and additional sources
 (for Chronology of Bishops) 
 (for Chronology of Bishops) 

17th-century Italian Roman Catholic bishops
Bishops appointed by Pope Alexander VII
1611 births
1669 deaths